Hippolyte-Julien-Joseph Lucas (20 December 1807, Rennes – 16 November 1878, Paris) was a French writer and critic whose literary output was largely centered on theatre and opera.

He was the author of several plays and opera libretti. In addition to his original stage works, Lucas also translated plays and libretti by other authors for performances in French. These included plays by Aristophanes, Euripides, Lope de Vega, and Calderón as well as Donizetti's operas Belisario, Maria Padilla, and Linda di Chamounix. He was the editor of Le Siècle, but his literary and theatrical criticism appeared in many other French journals as well, most notably L'Artiste, La Minerve, and Le Charivari. He was also a bookseller and later served as the librarian of the Bibliothèque de l'Arsenal.

Principal works

Opera libretti
 L'étoile de Seville, grand opéra in four acts, composed by Michael Balfe, 1845
 La bouquetière, opera in one act, composed by Adolphe Adam, 1847
 Le siège de Leyde, opera in four acts composed by Charles-Louis-Adolphe Vogel, 1847
 La Saint-André ou L'orpheline bretonne, opera in one act composed by Giovanni Luigi Bazzoni, 1849 
 Lalla-Roukh (with  Michel Carré), opéra comique in two acts, composed by Félicien David, 1862
Fior d'Aliza (with Michel Carré), opéra comique in four acts, composed by Victor Massé, 1866
Les parias, opera in 3 acts, composed by Edmond Membrée, 1874 
 
Non-fiction
Caractères et portraits de femmes, Brussels: Meline, 1836
 Histoire philosophique et littéraire du théatre français: depuis son origine jusqu'à nos jours, Paris: Gosselin, 1843
 Curiosités dramatiques et littéraires, Paris: Garnier frères, 1855

Poetry
Heures d'amour, Paris: Chez Jules Gay, 1864.
 Chants de divers pays (previously unpublished poems published posthumously by his son, Léo Lucas, and Olivier de Gourcuff. Nantes: Société des bibliophiles bretons et de l'histoire de Bretagne, 1893

References

Sources

Meyerbeer, Giacomo and Letellier, Robert (1999). The Diaries of Giacomo Meyerbeer: The Prussian years and Le Prophète, 1840-1849 (translated and annotated by Robert Ignatius Letellier). Associated University Presse. 
Robin, Charles (1848). "Hippolyte Lucas", Galerie des gens de lettres au XIXe siècle, pp. 213–232. Vict. Lecou 
Vapereau, Gustave (1858). "Lucas (Hippolyte-Julien-Joseph)", Dictionnaire universel des contemporains, Vol 2, pp. 1127–1128. Hachette

External links
 
Works by and about Hippolyte-Julien-Joseph Lucas on WorldCat

1807 births
1878 deaths
French opera librettists
French male dramatists and playwrights
19th-century French dramatists and playwrights
19th-century French male writers